Golf is a village in Cook County, Illinois, United States, incorporated in 1928. As of the 2020 census, the village had a population of 514. The community is primarily residential, and has a dedicated police department, post office, and Metra train stop.

History

The land which is now the village was originally inhabited by Chippewa, Ottawa, and Potawatomi peoples. It was designated for their settlement in the August 1825 First Treaty of Prairie du Chien.

Around 1830, John Dewes purchased  for 50 cents an acre from Antoine Ouilmette and became the first non-Indian settler in what is now Golf. Dewes first built a log cabin, then in 1834 he built a brick house - a mansion at the time. Both structures remain on the grounds of what is now the Glen View Club.

In 1897, the Glen View Club bought a portion of the Dewes land and built an 18-hole golf course.

Around 1899, one member, Albert J. Earling, President of the Chicago, Milwaukee and St. Paul Railroad, started taking his private rail car from his offices downtown to golf at the Glen View Golf Club. He would tell people he was "going to golf." Earling arranged to have his car switched to a special siding at what is now the Golf train station. Other members began using Earling's siding, and it soon became a regular stop known as the "golf stop". The siding remained until it was salvaged during World War II to reclaim the steel tracks for use in the war effort, according to residents of Golf at that time.

In 1925 Edward R. Diederich, a Chicago businessman, wanted to buy an acre of land near the Glen View Golf Club to build a country home. He found that in order to get the site he wanted, he would have to purchase a  tract that was being sold to close an estate. The 30 acres extended from the Golf train station to the Glen View Golf Club boundary. Diederich chose to purchase the land, and had it laid out with winding streets and big lots. He installed sewer, water, gas, and electricity, paved streets, sidewalks, and installed electric street lights. The village of Golf was incorporated in 1928. The Glen View Club was originally outside of Golf village limits until annexation c. 1975.

Geography

Demographics
As of the 2020 census there were 514 people, 167 households, and 137 families residing in the village. The racial makeup of the village was 83.46% White, 1.36% African American, 0.19% Native American, 5.64% Asian, 0.00% Pacific Islander, 3.50% from other races, and 5.84% from two or more races. Hispanic or Latino of any race were 6.81% of the population.

There were 167 households, out of which 85.03% had children under the age of 18 living with them, 80.24% were married couples living together, 1.80% had a female householder with no husband present, and 17.96% were non-families. 17.37% of all households were made up of individuals, and 16.77% had someone living alone who was 65 years of age or older. The average household size was 3.32 and the average family size was 2.92.

The village's age distribution consisted of 27.4% under the age of 18, 5.2% from 18 to 24, 14.4% from 25 to 44, 34.7% from 45 to 64, and 18.2% who were 65 years of age or older. The median age was 46.8 years. For every 100 females, there were 115.3 males. For every 100 females age 18 and over, there were 105.4 males.

The median income for a household in the village was $201,875, and the median income for a family was $240,313. Males had a median income of $126,250 versus $66,250 for females. The per capita income for the village was $92,636. No families and 3.5% of the population were below the poverty line, including none of those under age 18 and 15.8% of those age 65 or over.

Note: the US Census treats Hispanic/Latino as an ethnic category. This table excludes Latinos from the racial categories and assigns them to a separate category. Hispanics/Latinos can be of any race.

Education

Golf School was built in 1927, just south of the village, at a location that would become 9401 Waukegan Road in Morton Grove, but at the time it was a prototypical country school house, a wooden structure with 4 rooms, no electricity or running water. A 1930s Works Progress Administration project constructed a large brick structure east of the original building. Up until the 1980s, public school students from Golf attended Golf School (K-5), Golf Junior High School and Niles North High School. As demographics changed in the 1980s, Golf residents chose to abandon their namesake primary school district, and align with more upscale school districts in Glenview.

Currently students from Golf attending public school go to District 34 Lyon and Pleasant Ridge Elementary Schools, Springman Middle School, and District 225 Glenbrook South High School.

Infrastructure

Transportation
Golf is connected to Chicago's transportation network.

Roads
Interstate Highways:
  Edens Expressway
  Tri-State Tollway
Illinois State Routes:
  Waukegan Road
  Golf Road

Public Transit
Golf is served by the Metra Milwaukee District North Line, Amtrak Hiawatha Service and Empire Builder, and Pace suburban bus routes 208 and 210.

Airports
 O'Hare International Airport
 Midway Airport
 Chicago Executive Airport

References

External links

 Village of Golf 

Chicago metropolitan area
Populated places established in 1928
Villages in Cook County, Illinois
Villages in Illinois
1928 establishments in Illinois